Eddie Charlton (born 11 July 1988 in Nottingham) is a professional squash player who represents England. He reached a career-high world ranking of World No. 50 in April 2015. He coaches Sara Thomas.

Currently the head pro at the Toledo Club. Previously the head pro at University Club of Chicago. Eddie loves the community atmosphere of the sport.

References

External links 

English male squash players
Living people
1988 births